The term chromic acid  is usually used for a mixture made by adding concentrated sulfuric acid to a dichromate, which may contain a variety of compounds, including solid chromium trioxide. This kind of chromic acid may be used as a cleaning mixture for glass. Chromic acid may also refer to the molecular species, H2CrO4 of which the trioxide is the anhydride. Chromic acid features chromium in an oxidation state of +6 (or VI). It is a strong and corrosive oxidising agent and a moderate carcinogen.

Molecular chromic acid 

Molecular chromic acid, H2CrO4, has much in common with sulfuric acid, H2SO4. Only sulfuric acid can be classified as part of the 7 strong acids list. Due to the laws pertinent to the concept of "first order ionization energy", the first proton is lost most easily. It behaves extremely similarly to sulfuric acid deprotonation. Since the process of polyvalent acid-base titrations have more than one proton (especially when the acid is starting substance and the base is the titrant), protons can only leave an acid one at a time. Hence the first step is as follows: 

H2CrO4  [HCrO4]− + H+

The pKa for the equilibrium is not well characterized. Reported values vary between about −0.8 to 1.6. The value at zero ionic strength is difficult to determine because half dissociation only occurs in very acidic solution, at about pH 0, that is, with an acid concentration of about 1 mol dm−3. A further complication is that the ion [HCrO4]− has a marked tendency to dimerize, with the loss of a water molecule, to form the dichromate ion, [Cr2O7]2−:

2 [HCrO4]−  [Cr2O7]2− + H2O log KD = 2.05.

Furthermore, the dichromate can be protonated:

[HCr2O7]−  [Cr2O7]2− + H+ pK = 1.8

The pK value for this reaction shows that it can be ignored at pH > 4.

Loss of the second proton occurs in the pH range 4–8, making the ion [HCrO4]− a weak acid.

Molecular chromic acid could in principle be made by adding chromium trioxide to water (cf. manufacture of sulfuric acid).

CrO3 + H2O  H2CrO4

but in practice the reverse reaction occurs when molecular chromic acid is dehydrated. This is what happens when concentrated sulfuric acid is added to a dichromate solution. At first the colour changes from orange (dichromate) to red (chromic acid) and then deep red crystals of chromium trioxide precipitate from the mixture, without further colour change. The colours are due to LMCT transitions.

Chromium trioxide is the anhydride of molecular chromic acid. It is a Lewis acid and can react with a Lewis base, such as pyridine in a non-aqueous medium such as dichloromethane (Collins reagent).

Dichromic acid 
Dichromic acid, H2Cr2O7  is the fully protonated form of the dichromate ion and also can be seen as the product of adding chromium trioxide to molecular chromic acid. Dichromic acid will behave the same exact way when reacting with a primary or secondary alcohol. The caveat to this statement is that a secondary alcohol will be oxidized no further than a ketone, whereas a primary alcohol will be oxidized to a aldehyde for the first step of the mechanism and then oxidized again to a carboxylic acid, contingent on no significant steric hindrance impeding this reaction. 

Dichromic acid undergoes the following reaction: 

[Cr2O7]2− + 2H+  H2Cr2O7  H2CrO4 + CrO3

It is probably present in chromic acid cleaning mixtures along with the mixed chromosulfuric acid H2CrSO7.

Uses
Chromic acid is an intermediate in chromium plating, and is also used in ceramic glazes, and colored glass. Because a solution of chromic acid in sulfuric acid (also known as a sulfochromic mixture or chromosulfuric acid)  is a powerful oxidizing agent, it can be used to clean laboratory glassware, particularly of otherwise insoluble organic residues. This application has declined due to environmental concerns. Furthermore, the acid leaves trace amounts of paramagnetic chromic ions that can interfere with certain applications, such as NMR spectroscopy. This is especially the case for NMR tubes.

Chromic acid was widely used in the musical instrument repair industry, due to its ability to "brighten" raw brass.  A chromic acid dip leaves behind a bright yellow patina on the brass.  Due to growing health and environmental concerns, many have discontinued use of this chemical in their repair shops.

It was used in hair dye in the 1940s, under the name Melereon.

It is used as a bleach in black and white photographic reversal processing.

Reactions
Chromic acid is capable of oxidizing many kinds of organic compounds and many variations on this reagent have been developed:
 Chromic acid in aqueous sulfuric acid and acetone  is known as the Jones reagent, which will oxidize primary and secondary alcohols to carboxylic acids and ketones respectively, while rarely affecting unsaturated bonds.
 Pyridinium chlorochromate is generated from chromium trioxide and pyridinium chloride. This reagent converts primary alcohols to the corresponding aldehydes (R–CHO).
 Collins reagent is an adduct of chromium trioxide and pyridine used for diverse oxidations.
 Chromyl chloride, CrO2Cl2 is a well-defined molecular compound that is generated from chromic acid.

Illustrative transformations
 Oxidation of methylbenzenes to benzoic acids.
 Oxidative scission of indene to homophthalic acid.
 Oxidation of secondary alcohol to ketone (cyclooctanone) and nortricyclanone.

Use in qualitative organic analysis
In organic chemistry, dilute solutions of chromic acid can be used to oxidize primary or secondary alcohols to the corresponding aldehydes and ketones. Similarly, it can also be used to oxidize an aldehyde to its corresponding carboxylic acid. Tertiary alcohols and ketones are unaffected. Because the oxidation is signaled by a color change from orange to brownish green (indicating chromium being reduced from oxidation state +6 to +3), chromic acid is commonly used as a lab reagent in high school or undergraduate college chemistry as a qualitative analytical test for the presence of primary or secondary alcohols, or aldehydes.

Alternative reagents
In oxidations of alcohols or aldehydes into carboxylic acids, chromic acid is one of several reagents, including several that are catalytic. For example, nickel(II) salts catalyze oxidations by bleach (hypochlorite). Aldehydes are relatively easily oxidised to carboxylic acids, and mild oxidising agents are sufficient. Silver(I) compounds have been used for this purpose. Each oxidant offers advantages and disadvantages. Instead of using chemical oxidants, electrochemical oxidation is often possible.

Safety
Hexavalent chromium compounds (including chromium trioxide, chromic acids, chromates, chlorochromates) are toxic and carcinogenic. For this reason, chromic acid oxidation is not used on an industrial scale except in the aerospace industry.

Chromium trioxide and chromic acids are strong oxidisers and may react violently if mixed with easily oxidisable organic substances. Fires or explosions may result.

Chromic acid burns are treated with a dilute sodium thiosulfate solution.

See also
  able to dissolve elemental carbon

Notes

References
 Alcohols from Carbonyl Compounds: Oxidation-Reduction and Organometallic Compounds (PDF)

External links
 
 
 IARC Monograph "Chromium and Chromium compounds"

Hydrogen compounds
Chromates
Oxidizing agents
Oxidizing acids
Mineral acids
Transition metal oxoacids